"United" is an instrumental composition by Dutch disc jockeys and producers Tiësto, Quintino and ALVARO. It was released on 5 February 2013 in the United States. It was the official anthem for the 2013 edition of Ultra Music Festival in Miami. It is the first single from the Tiësto mixed compilation Club Life, Vol. 3 - Stockholm which includes a remixed version of the composition by Tiësto and Blasterjaxx.

Track listing 
Digital Download (UL3845)
 "United" (Ultra Music Festival Anthem) - 6:22

Digital Download (UL4042)
 "United" (Ultra Music Festival Anthem) (Tiësto & Blasterjaxx Remix) - 6:52

Digital Download (UL4494)
 "United" (Ultra Music Festival Anthem) (Revero Remix) - 7:01

Charts

References 

2013 songs
2013 singles
Tiësto songs
Songs written by Tiësto